The Pit is the fictional headquarters of the specialist G.I. Joe team from the 1980s Marvel comic book created by Larry Hama. It is a multi-level underground base complete with training facilities, living quarters, a briefing room, and heavy equipment storage.

Three versions of the Pit have been presented as existing within the comic books.

The Pit (or Pit I) 
The original Pit was secretly located underneath the Chaplains Assistant School's motor pool at Fort Wadsworth in Staten Island, New York. Most of the characters in the school, with the exception of members of the G.I. Joe team, had no idea of the Pit's existence.

According to a blueprint provided in the comic book (issue #1 of the series as published by Marvel Comics), the original incarnation of the base is five levels deep. The first level houses heavy vehicles and weapons, with the second level containing electronic communications and briefing rooms. The training area is situated upon the third level, complete with swimming pool, whilst the fourth level contains an armory and living quarters. The fifth level houses computers and generators and is where classified documents are located.

The base is represented as able to withstand a direct hit from a five-megaton warhead.

This structure is the focus of issue three. A seemingly deactivated robot and its hidden mobile transmitters go amok deep inside the Pit. The Joes manage to neutralize all threats. Multiple features are examined in depth; for example the blast doors that lock out most rooms and the ventilation system that connects to the chaplain's facilities above.

Within the comic books, the secret nature of the Pit was somewhat revealed. Cobra attacks the base in G.I. Joe #19, destroying the motor pool. Due to trickery, the Cobra soldiers believe the pool to have been the facade for an armored fortress, somewhat reminiscent of the G.I. Joe headquarters in the cartoon series. The fortress itself is destroyed, but the Pit below remains relatively intact. During the battle, General Flagg is shot dead in the Pit's brig by Major Bludd.

Beginning in IDW's G.I. Joe: A Real American Hero #206 (August 2014), the G.I. Joe team has sent a small contingent to reactivate the facility to use as a multi-tier staging area.

Pit II 
The second version of the Pit is shown within the comic books to be a repair and improvement of the original. According to a blueprint provided in the comic book (G.I. Joe #22, Marvel series), it's rebuilt to six stories in depth, depicted as having been designed to be more defensible and impregnable. Among the improvements shown to the reader, are the addition of a helicopter launching pad near to the motor pool; improved nuclear blast protection; an ICBM missile silo; an earth boring machine located at the lowest level, to facilitate an escape; a small nuclear power plant; an additional level with rest and relaxation facilities; larger living quarters to accommodate increasing number of Joes; and detention facility to hold prisoners. Latrines are also shown, a feature missing in the original Pit blueprint. The renovation is represented as having taken about six months to complete within the time-frame of the fictional universe.

Reconstruction is seen by the reader to begin in G.I. Joe #22 (Marvel series), with the creators presenting the base as re-opened in G.I. Joe #33. The second Pit is not to last long however with Cobra learning the exact location of the Joes' headquarters, infiltrating and attacking the Pit from within in G.I. Joe #53. Most of the Joes are not in the PIT at the time and are involved in the battle above. Only four soldiers are inside the actual Pit, General Hawk and three high-ranking military officials. They battle dozens of B.A.T.s, android soldiers. Two die in separate incidents in order to save the others. The survivors, General Hollingsworth and General Hawk, escape moments before the entire PIT is destroyed. This seemingly buries Cobra Commander and Destro. Hollingsworth throws in his influence behind Hawk, restoring G.I. Joe its needed capabilities to battle Cobra. After the attack, the Joes no longer have a permanent headquarters, and operate as a nomad unit. This status, however, is not to last long either.

Pit III 
Pit III is located within the fictional universe as being in a desert in Utah, with its exact location not revealed to the reader.

No blueprint was provided to readers, however, in issue #63, the base is presented to readers as appearing externally to be a small outpost ringed by fences with three quonset huts. These buildings themselves have their own uses; Outback lays out for a nap in one. The reader is shown, through the action depicted within the comic books, two entrances to Pit III. The first being a trapdoor located in one of the huts, and the other a sand-covered, mechanically controlled ramp also leading underground. This entrance is shown as being used for heavy equipment and vehicles. Many Joes are shown as having helped construct the Pit personally.

Despite G.I. Joe's status being depicted as that of a nomad unit after the destruction of Pit II, the need for another Pit is shown to the reader to arise through the plot based upon the need to secretly house the Defiant shuttle complex. Signs of the base are shown as being immediately visible to Cobra during construction via spy satellites, but in spite of this, the Joes are presented as having more success defending this base than previous Pits.

Cobra are shown to try to destroy Pit III three times:
 G.I. Joe #83 - Cobra attempt a direct assault. However, an informant tips off the Joes, and we are shown Cobra destroying the huts only to find no entrance. It's revealed that the Joes have simply moved the huts a mile from the Pit's actual location.
 G.I. Joe #100 - Cobra try to destroy the Pit from the inside by activating two brainwashed Joes: Clutch and Rock n Roll. The presence of two young girls cause the two soldiers to fight their programming, as they did not wish to harm anyone innocent. This mental fight breaks the conditioning and they pass out.
 G.I. Joe #130 to 131 - Led by the original Cobra Commander, the two-part story depicted another direct assault on the base. Although shown to be caught by surprise, the Joes manage to hold off Cobra's attacks and take the fight to Cobra. However, the Joes' success in this battle is that of a pyrrhic victory; in addition to heavy equipment losses on the Joe's side, it's revealed that the Cobra Commander's primary aim is to document the success of Cobra's ability to defeat U.S. radar systems and market this ability to his clients.

Pit III is shown to be deactivated along with the G.I. Joe team in #155.

When IDW continued the Real American Hero series, the G.I. Joe team return to this Pit in #161 and took it out of mothballs. In #200, they discovered the Pit III was part of a larger, more secret base and a blueprint was finally shown of the revised base.

Pit IV 
Pit IV was built in the Devil's Due G.I. Joe comic series and is located in a desert in Arizona close to real-life military base Fort Huachuca. In #11, General Hawk, frustrated by the lack of funding and equipment for the reinstated Joes, blackmailed Winters, a U.S. general who secretly has deals with Cobra, to asking Congress for the funding. Hawk gave the general a list of what he needs. Among the request is for a new Pit.

Pit IV is the central hub of G.I. Joe operations with offices in eight cities all over America. Access to the Pit is restricted to full team members only. Greenshirts are trained in various bases over the country. Blueprint of the new Pit is detailed one level per issue of the Devil's Due series. Although this is the fourth Pit in the G.I. Joe comic universe, the base was never referred to as "Pit IV", but simply as the "Pit".

The location of this Pit was discovered through Cobra operative Wraith's spying. Pit IV was destroyed by G.I. Joe rather than let it fall to Cobra hands in #39 of the Devil's Due series.

The Rock
In G.I. Joe: America's Elite, the headquarters are called "The Rock", a hidden complex located within a mountain in Yellowstone National Park. In the final issue of the America's Elite run, the G.I. Joe team returns its operations to Fort Wadsworth, site of the original "Pit".

2009 film
In G.I. Joe: The Rise of Cobra, the Pit is located in Egypt. It's a massive, high-tech facility that serves as the primary headquarters for G.I. Joe. The first level consists of a large hangar for transport craft, while subsequent levels have training facilities, a large pool for submarine warfare training, and living quarters. Cobra discovers the base's location with a tracking beacon and launches a surprise attack to retrieve the nano-mite warheads G.I. Joe is protecting. Though Cobra is successful in stealing the warheads and causing significant damage and casualties, the Pit remains operational. However, at the end of the film, G.I. Joe abandoned the Pit, shifting their operations in an Operation code named Mongoose. All ground transports went to  Base Brothers Grimm (more likely to in the black Forrest in Germany) and All Howler Hunters went to Base Roman Ruin (more than likely to be under the Colosseum). The prisoners were transferred to cells aboard the aircraft carrier that is believed to be  the USS Flagg.

The 2009 Rise of Cobra toyline presents the Pit as a massive, rolling vehicle/playset similar to the Mobile Command Center.

Notes

G.I. Joe
Fictional secret bases
Fictional subterranea